Rowing at the 1968 Summer Olympics featured seven events, for men only. The events took place at Lake Xochimilco.

Medal summary

Men's events

Participating nations

A total of 353 rowers from 29 nations competed at the Mexico Games:

Medal table

References

External links
 International Olympic Committee medal database

 
1968 Summer Olympics events
1968
Summer Olympics